The Northern Great Plain is a statistical (NUTS 2) region of Hungary. It is part of the Great Plain and North (NUTS 1) region.

Gallery

See also
List of regions of Hungary

References 

NUTS 2 statistical regions of the European Union
Northern Great Plain